Atmos may refer to:
 An abbreviation for the Earth's atmosphere
 The atmosphere (unit), a unit of pressure

Atmos may also refer to:
 ATMOS (festival), The Technical Festival of BITS Pilani Hyderabad Campus
 Atmos Energy Corporation, a U.S. energy company
 Atmos clock, a clock manufactured by Jaeger-LeCoultre, which runs on changes in ambient temperature
 Oric Atmos, a home computer first marketed in 1984
 Ambience (sound recording), sounds of a given location or space
 Dolby Atmos, surround sound format
 ATMOS Software, an Australian computer and video game company
 Atmos (character), a minor character in the 30th century DC Universe
 Atmos Heating Systems, a British supplier of industrial and domestic heaters
 ATMOS (ATMospheric Omission System), fictional technology in the 2008 Doctor Who two-part serial "The Sontaran Stratagem" / "The Poison Sky"
 ATMOS 2000, a self-propelled Israeli artillery system produced by Soltam Systems Ltd
 EMC Atmos, a clustered computer storage system from EMC Corporation
 Workshop on Algorithmic Approaches for Transportation Modeling, Optimization, and Systems (ATMOS)
 Atmos (album), an album by Miroslav Vitouš

See also 
 Atos (disambiguation)